Ab Bakhshan (also Romanized as Āb Bakhshān; also known as Ābakhshīān) is a village in Malmir Rural District, Sarband District, Shazand County, Markazi Province, Iran. At the 2006 census, its population was 127, in 36 families.

References 

Populated places in Shazand County